Transcontinental Conspiracy is an album by Vas Deferens Organization and Brad Laner, released in 1996 by Quaquaversal Vinyl. The album was remastered and re-issued on Niklas Records in 2011, accompanied by the additional track "Scheming Foils".

Recording
Music by Mercury Rev appears in "First Plane Not to Plummet Seaward" and "Monk Fish Liver Transplant Plate". Regarding the band's involvement, Lumbleau has stated: "Their material was generated during a spontaneous pre-gig jam that occurred at our studio while they waited there for an interview that never ultimately transpired. These jams were later integrated into the fabric of our compositions and are featured prominently on two of the CD's four tracks."

Track listing

Personnel 
Adapted from the Transcontinental Conspiracy liner notes.

Musicians
Matt Castille – instruments, production
Eric Lumbleau – instruments, production
Brad Laner – instruments, production, vocals (3)

Additional personnel
Grasshopper – instruments (2, 3)
Josh Laner – instruments (4)
Bryan Polman – instruments (2, 3)
Jason Russo – instruments (2, 3)
Suzanne Thorpe – instruments (2, 3)

Release history

References

External links 
 

1996 albums
Collaborative albums
Brad Laner albums
Vas Deferens Organization albums